B63 may refer to :
 Sicilian, Richter-Rauzer, Rauzer attack, according to the list of chess openings
 HLA-B63, an HLA-B serotype
 Bundesstraße 63, a German road
 B63 (New York City bus) in Brooklyn
 63 amp, type B – a standard circuit breaker current rating